Abner Edward Weed (September 18, 1842, in Dixmont, Maine – June 14, 1917 in Weed, California) served as a soldier in the American Civil War with Company C, 8th Maine Infantry Regiment, and was present at Appomattox, Virginia, to witness Lee's surrender to Grant. On September 18, 1866, he married Rachel C. Cunningham, and came to California in 1869, locating in Truckee.  Between 1869 and 1889, he was actively engaged in the development of the country between Truckee and Sierraville. In 1889, he moved with his family to Mount Shasta where he was actively engaged in industry and important developments of Siskiyou County.  He was the founder of the mammoth Weed holdings at Weed, and the builder of the Hotel Weed in Dunsmuir, California, which bears his name.  He built and sold the S.P. Co. thirty miles of railroad from Weed to Grass Lake in 1902, and in 1904 sold his immense holdings at Weed to R.A. Long of Kansas City, Mo.  Besides this he accumulated large property interests in Oregon, Scott Valley and near Stockton.  He served this district as Senator during the years of 1907–1909, and was Siskiyou county supervisor for eight years.

References

External links
Join California Abner Weed

1842 births
1917 deaths
Union Army soldiers
People from Dixmont, Maine
People from Mount Shasta, California
People from Siskiyou County, California
Republican Party California state senators
20th-century American politicians